Isaak Soreau (1604 in Frankfurt – 1644 in Frankfurt), was a German Baroque painter.

Biography
According to the RKD he was the son of the painter Daniel Soreau, and the twin brother of Peter, who went to live in Amsterdam on the Herengracht, where he became engaged on 17 April 1677, aged 31, to Louysa Eygels. His witness was his mother Constantia Hochepied. His works are strongly reminiscent of the painter Jacob van Hulsdonck, leading historians to believe that he must have worked for him in his workshop in Antwerp at some point, though this as yet has not been firmly documented, and it is more likely that he was taught by Georg Flegel during his Frankfurt years, whose works have been attributed in the past to Osias Beert.  Soreau, the son of an Antwerp painter in Frankfurt, specialized in "table-top still lifes," featuring fruits, flowers, and insects.

An Isaak Soreau was regent of the Nieuwe Zijds Huiszitten almshouse of Amsterdam in 1681.

References

Isaak Soreau on Artnet

1604 births
1644 deaths
German Baroque painters
Artists from Frankfurt
Flower artists